The 2013 FIVB Beach Volleyball World Tour is an international beach volleyball circuit organized by the Fédération Internationale de Volleyball (FIVB).

From this season, the FIVB World Tour calendar comprises the 10 FIVB World Tour Grand Slams and the FIVB Beach Volleyball World Championships.

For the first time since 2002 the competition does not take the name of Swatch, the main sponsor.

Schedule

Men

Women

Medal table by country

Open tournaments
In this season, the FIVB Open tournaments no longer form part of the World Tour and are considered separate events.

Men

Women

References

External links
2013 FIVB World Tour at FIVB.org

 

World Tour
2013